Pipestone River or Creek may refer to:

Canada
Pipestone Creek, a waterway in central Alberta near Millet, Alberta
Pipestone River (Kenora District), a tributary of the Winisk River
North Pipestone River (Ontario), a river of Ontario and a tributary of the above
Pipestone River (Rainy River District), a river of Ontario in the Nelson River watershed
Pipestone Creek (Saskatchewan) a river that starts in Saskatchewan and flows into Manitoba; see The French Counts of St Hubert, Saskatchewan
Pipestone River, a tributary of the Cree River in Saskatchewan

Other places
Little Pipestone Creek, in Jefferson County, Montana, U.S.

See also
Pipestone (disambiguation)
Pipestone River Provincial Park, a protected area of Ontario